is a multi-purpose dam located in the city of Ōno in Fukui Prefecture. Japan, completed in 1957.

References 

Dams in Fukui Prefecture
Dams completed in 1957
Ōno, Fukui